This is a list of butterflies of Lord Howe Island.

Hesperiidae

Hesperiinae
Taractrocera papyria  (Boisduval, 1832)

Papilionidae

Papilioninae
Graphium macleayanus insulana  (Waterhouse, 1920)
Papilio aegeus aegeus  Donovan, 1805
Papilio demoleus sthenelus  (Macleay, 1826)

Pieridae

Coliadinae
Catopsilia pyranthe crokera  (MacLeay, 1826) 
Eurema brigitta australis  (Wallace, 1867) 
Eurema smilax smilax  (Donovan, 1805)

Pierinae
Appias paulina ega  (Boisduval, 1836) 
Belenois java teutonia  (Fabricius, 1775) 
Belenois java peristhene  (Boisduval, 1859)

Lycaenidae

Theclinae
Lucia limbaria  Swainson, 1833

Polyommatinae
Candalides xanthospilos  (Hübner, 1817) 
Lampides boeticus  (Linnaeus, 1767) 
Zizina labradus labradus  (Godart, 1824) 
Everes lacturnus pulchra  (Rothschild, 1915) 
Danaus plexippus plexippus  (Linnaeus, 1758) 
Euploea corinna  (Macleay, 1826)

Nymphalidae

Satyrinae
Melanitis leda bankia  (Fabricius, 1775)

Danainae
Danaus petilia  (Stoll, 1790)

Charaxinae
Polyura sempronius tiberius  (Waterhouse, 1920) 
Hypolimnas bolina nerina  (Fabricius, 1775) 
Junonia villida calybe  (Godart, 1819) 
Cynthia kershawi  McCoy, 1868
Bassaris itea  (Fabricius, 1775)

References
W.John Tennent: A checklist of the butterflies of Melanesia, Micronesia, Polynesia and some adjacent areas. Zootaxa 1178: 1-209 (21 Apr. 2006)

Butterflies
'Lord Howe Island
Lord Howe Island
Lord Howe Island
butterflies of Lord Howe Island